East River St. Marys is a small community in the Canadian province of Nova Scotia, located in  Pictou County.

References
East River St. Marys on Destination Nova Scotia

Communities in Pictou County